The 2016–17 National Basketball League (Bulgaria) season was the 76th season of the Bulgarian NBL. The season started on October 14, 2016 and ended on May 30, 2017.

Teams

Chernomorets resigned from the league due to financial difficulties.

Regular season

League table

Results

First stage

Second stage
Home and away games depend of table after the first stage.

Playoffs

NBL clubs in European competitions

References

External links
NBL official website

National Basketball League (Bulgaria) seasons
Bulgarian
Basketball